Joanna De Souza (born October 22, 1955) is a Canadian Kathak choreographer, dancer and teacher. She is the only Canadian born artist to achieve a master's degree in kathak dance through the Prayag Sangit Samiti, Allahabad, India.

Early life 
De Souza was born and raised in Whitby, Ontario. She started studying piano at the age of five, and as a teenager, was a member of an award-winning classical vocal group for nine voices, under the directorship of Marian Williams. She studied figure skating throughout her childhood, but had no background in dance.

Education
After studying Forestry for one year at Lakehead University in Thunder Bay, she moved to British Columbia, and then traveled to California in 1978, where she began studying Kathak under her first and current teacher, Pandit Chitresh Das. De Souza received her Bachelor's and master's degrees in kathak through the Prayag Sangeet Samiti, standing first in all of India.

M-DO/Kathak Toronto
De Souza married tabla player, Ritesh Das in 1981. In 1988, they moved to Toronto and together, established M-DO/Kathak Toronto and the Toronto Tabla Ensemble. Since then, De Souza has been teaching Kathak to students in Toronto. She has performed all over Canada and India and has been the recipient of numerous grants and awards.  She is now married to bassist and composer, Ian De Souza.

References 

1955 births
Living people
Canadian choreographers
Dance teachers
Kathak exponents
People from Whitby, Ontario
Performers of Indian classical dance
Canadian women choreographers